"I Care" is a song written and recorded by American country music artist Tom T. Hall. It was released in December 1974 as the only single from the album, Songs of Fox Hollow. "I Care" was Hall's sixth number one on the U.S. country singles chart. The single had a one-week stay at number one and remained on the chart for a total of ten weeks.

B-side 

The B-side of the single "I Care" was "Sneaky Snake," which charted as a tag-along flip side due to airplay.

"Sneaky Snake" is a novelty song about an anthropomorphic snake who likes sneaking up on people and stealing their root beer. After omnisciently observing how Sneaky Snake "goes dancin', wigglin' and a-hissin'/Sneaky Snake goes dancin', gigglin' and a-kissin'''," the singer states how he doesn't like him because he laughs, due to moving through the grass and "ticklin' his underneath."

Both songs can be found on Greatest Hits Vol. 2'' (1975).

Charts

Weekly charts

Year-end charts

References 

1974 singles
Tom T. Hall songs
Songs written by Tom T. Hall
Song recordings produced by Jerry Kennedy
1974 songs
Mercury Records singles